This is a list of schools in the London Borough of Hammersmith and Fulham, England.

State-funded schools

Primary schools 

Addison Primary School
All Saints CE Primary School
Ark Bentworth Primary Academy
Ark Burlington Danes Academy
Ark Conway Primary Academy
Ark Swift Primary Academy
Avonmore Primary School 
Brackenbury Primary School
Earl's Court Free School Primary
Flora Gardens Primary School
Fulham Primary School
Good Shepherd RC Primary School
Greenside Primary School
Holy Cross RC School
John Betts Primary School
Kenmont Primary School
Langford Primary School
Larmenier & Sacred Heart RC Primary School
London Oratory School
Melcombe Primary School
Miles Coverdale Primary School
Normand Croft Community School
Old Oak Primary School
Queen's Manor School
St Augustine's RC Primary School
St John XXIII RC Primary School
St John's Walham Green CE Primary School
St Mary's RC Primary School
St Paul's CE Primary School
St Peter's Primary School
St Stephen's School 
St Thomas of Canterbury RC Primary School
Sir John Lillie Primary School
Sulivan Primary School
Thomas's Academy
Wendell Park Primary School
West London Free School Primary
Wormholt Park Primary School

Secondary schools 

Ark Burlington Danes Academy (CE, mixed)
The Fulham Boys School (CE, boys)
Fulham Cross Academy (mixed)
Fulham Cross Girls' School (girls)
Hammersmith Academy (mixed)
The Hurlingham Academy (mixed)
Lady Margaret School (CE, girls)
London Oratory School (RC, boys)
Phoenix Academy (mixed)
Sacred Heart High School (RC, girls)
West London Free School (mixed)

Special and alternative schools 
Cambridge School
Jack Tizard School
Ormiston Bridge Academy
Ormiston Courtyard Academy
Queensmill School
Westside School
Woodlane High School

Further education 
Ealing, Hammersmith and West London College
William Morris Sixth Form

Independent schools

Primary and preparatory schools 

Azbuka Russian-English Bilingual School
Bute House Preparatory School for Girls
Ecole Française de Londres Jacques Prévert
Evergreen Primary School
Kensington Preparatory School
L'Ecole des Petits School
Parsons Green Prep School
Ravenscourt Park Preparatory School
St James Junior School
Sinclair House School
Thomas's London Day School

Senior and all-through schools 
Fulham School (Co-ed)
Godolphin and Latymer School (Selective, girls)
Latymer Upper School (Selective, co-ed)
St James Independent School for Senior Girls  (Girls)
St Paul's Girls' School (Selective, girls)
Young Dancers Academy (Selective, co-ed)

Special and alternative schools 
The Moat School
Parayhouse School
TLG West London

References

External links 
School Directory - Hammersmith & Fulham Borough Council
Schools in Hammersmith & Fulham LEA - Department for Education

Hammersmith and Fulham
Schools in the London Borough of Hammersmith and Fulham